Trade Union Act (with its many variations) is a stock short title used for legislation in various countries which relates to trade unions. The Bill for an Act with this short title will have been known as a Trade Union Bill during its passage through Parliament.

Trade Union Acts may be a generic name either for legislation bearing that short title or for all legislation which amends the law relating to trade unions. In the United Kingdom, it is a term of art.

List

Australia
The Trade Union Act 1915 (Queensland)
The Trade Union Act 1881 (New South Wales)

Canada
The Trade Unions Act, 1872
The Trade Unions Act, 1985

India
The Trade Unions Act, 1926 (Replaced by Industrial Relations Code, 2020)

Japan
The Trade Union Act of 1949

Laos

The Trade Union Act 2007

Malaysia
The Trade Unions Act 1959

Sudan
The Trade Unions Act of 1971

Tanzania

The Trade Union Act No. 10 (1998)

United Kingdom
The Trade Union Act 1871 (34 & 35 Vict c 31)
The Trade Union Amendment Act 1876
The Trade Disputes Act 1906 (6 Edw 7 c 47)
The Trade Union Act 1913 (3 & 4 Geo 5 c 30)
The Trade Union (Amalgamation) Act 1917
The Trade Disputes and Trade Unions Act 1927
The Trade Disputes and Trade Unions Act 1946
The Trade Union (Amalgamations) Act 1964
The Trade Disputes Act 1965
The Trade Union and Labour Relations Act 1974 (c 52)
The Trade Union and Labour Relations (Amendment) Act 1976 (c 7)
The Trade Union Act 1984
The Trade Union and Labour Relations (Consolidation) Act 1992
The Trade Union Reform and Employment Rights Act 1993 (c 19)
The Trade Union Act 2016
The Trade Union (Wales) Act 2017

The Trade Union Acts
The Trade Union Acts 1871 to 1906 means the Trade Union Acts 1871 and 1876 and Trade Disputes Act 1906.
The Trade Union Acts 1871 to 1913 means the Trade Union Acts 1871 to 1906 and the Trade Union Act 1913.
The Trade Union Acts 1871 to 1964 means the Trade Union Acts 1871 to 1913 and the Trade Union (Amalgamations) Act 1964.
The Trade Union Acts 1871 to 1971 means ... It is applicable to Northern Ireland.

See also
List of short titles

References

Lists of legislation by short title and collective title